Slumberland Records is an American independent record label, formed in 1989 in Washington, D.C. and based in Oakland, California. The label has released recordings by Velocity Girl, Honeybunch, Lilys, Stereolab, Evans The Death, St. Christopher, Boyracer, Beatnik Filmstars, 14 Iced Bears, and The Pains of Being Pure at Heart.

History
Inspired by independent punk labels such as K Records, Slumberland was created as a collective effort consisting of members of D.C. area bands Velocity Girl and Big Jesus Trash Can as a mecca for indie pop bands, seldom heard outside of the K Records label.

The debut Slumberland Records release was "What Kind of Heaven Do You Want?", a shared 7" featuring early line-ups of Velocity Girl, Black Tambourine, and Powderburns.  The record was sold in December 1989, limited to 1000 copies with some sort of hand coloring.

By 1992, Slumberland Records was exclusively managed by Michael Schulman and operations were moved from Silver Spring, Maryland to Berkeley, California.

In 1993, Slumberland Records started a in-company record promotion label called "I Wish I Was a Slumberland Record", using colored vinyl instead of black vinyl for up-and-coming bands.  The debut release for the WISH label was Sleepyhead's "Sick of Heaven" 7".

In 2001, Slumberland Records went on a temporary hiatus after The Saturday People self-titled full-length but returned in 2003 to release the vinyl version of The Aislers Set third full-length How I Learned to Write Backwards.

The label once again returned to active status in 2006, releasing albums by The Lodger, Sarandon, Crystal Stilts, Cause Co-Motion!, as well as numerous 7" singles.

Catalog

DRYL catalog discography (1989-1992)

SLR catalog discography (1992-present)

WISH catalog discography (1993-present)

References

External links
 Slumberland Records website
 Washington Post: Slumberland celebrates its 20th

American independent record labels
Indie pop record labels